Malaryta or Malorita is a city in Brest Region, Belarus. It is the administrative centre of Malaryta District. The name of the city comes from the Ryta river.

History
Within the Grand Duchy of Lithuania, Malaryta was part of Brest Litovsk Voivodeship. In 1795, Malaryta was acquired by the Russian Empire as a result of the Third Partition of Poland.

From 1921 until 1939, Malaryta (Małoryta) was part of the Second Polish Republic. In September 1939, Malaryta was occupied by the Red Army and, on 14 November 1939, incorporated into the Byelorussian SSR.

From 22 June 1941 until 20 July 1944, Malaryta was occupied by Nazi Germany and administered as a part of the Generalbezirk Wolhynien-Podolien of Reichskommissariat Ukraine.

Notable people
 Leonid Taranenko
 Barys Pukhouski

External links
 

Cities in Belarus
Populated places in Brest Region
Brest Litovsk Voivodeship
Brestsky Uyezd
Polesie Voivodeship
Malaryta District